Heterotheca brandegeei is a rare Mexican species of flowering plant in the family Asteraceae.

The plant is endemic to Mexico, found only in the Sierra San Pedro Martir range in the state of Baja California, in the Baja California Norte region of the Baja California Peninsula.  The Sierra San Pedro Martir is a mountain range in the Peninsular Ranges system of Southern California and the Baja California Peninsula.

References

brandegeei
Flora of Baja California
Endemic flora of Mexico
Natural history of the Peninsular Ranges
Plants described in 1896